Jennifer A. Konner (born May 15, 1971) is an American television writer, producer and director. She is best known as co-showrunner and writer with Lena Dunham of the HBO series Girls. In 2016, she directed the season finale of the fifth season of Girls entitled "I Love You Baby" and in 2017, she directed the episode "Latching," which served as the series finale; both episodes were co-written by Judd Apatow, Dunham and Konner.

With Lena Dunham, she ran a production company and is co-founder of the feminist newsletter, Lenny Letter, and its Random House imprint, Lenny Books.

Early life 
Konner was born to a Jewish family in Brooklyn, New York, and grew up in Los Angeles, California. She is daughter of American television writers Lawrence Konner and Ronnie Wenker-Konner (née Wenker). Konner has a younger brother, Jeremy Konner, who directs and produces the Comedy Central program Drunk History.

Konner graduated from Crossroads School, a progressive high school in Santa Monica. In 1994, Konner graduated from Sarah Lawrence College.

Career 
After finishing school, Konner began working with friend and writing partner Alexandra Rushfield. They were both hired as writers for Judd Apatow's sitcom Undeclared. They then went on to create two short-lived network shows together: Help Me Help You and In the Motherhood. After that the pair stopped writing together and Konner began working as a script doctor. She was hired on a few big-budget Hollywood films to help the writers flesh out their female characters, most notably Transformers: Dark of the Moon.

Partnership with Lena Dunham and Girls 
Konner was first introduced to Lena Dunham's work through watching Dunham's 2010 film Tiny Furniture. Konner was a big fan of the film and so jumped at the opportunity when HBO offered her the role of supervising Dunham for her new series Girls. Since then Konner has become the show's official co-show-runner, an executive producer and she has written occasional episodes. The show premiered on HBO in 2012 and has since won numerous awards. Dunham and Konner are good friends and have collaborated on several other projects. They also started a production company together called A Casual Romance, with the intent of addressing the gender imbalance in TV and film. On her relationship with Dunham, Konner says "We just really love spending time together, which is good because we mostly have to be together all day every day."

In 2017, Konner and her Girls co-showrunner Lena Dunham put out a joint statement to the Hollywood Reporter, publicly defending staff writer Murray Miller against sexual assault allegations made by Aurora Perrineau and claiming to have "insider knowledge of Murray's situation." Dunham later apologized for her statement and admitted that she and Konner had no "insider information" and that this claim had been a lie. While Dunham issued a public apology for her actions, Konner has to date never issued a public apology.

In July 2018 Dunham and Konner released a joint statement to The Hollywood Reporter where they stated they had made the decision to split as producing partners ahead of the December expiration date of their joint overall deal with HBO for their A Casual Romance Productions banner. At the time, the reason for this sudden decision was not made public but in January 2022 Dunham told Hollywood Reporter that midway through production on Camping, she had left to enter rehab. When she returned from rehab, Dunham and Konner went their separate ways. When asked if the "timing was more than coincidental" with the split coming after her rehab stint, Dunham responded, "I think my recovery played a part in the break with Jenni insofar as it showed me that I needed to pause and clear the slate. I needed to almost start again and just hear my own voice."

Other work 
In January 2015, Dunham and Konner released a documentary for HBO about Hilary Knight, the illustrator of the children's books Eloise. Konner worked as the Executive Producer on the project and it was their first production with their company A Casual Romance. The production company's most recent work, Suited, premiered at the Sundance Film Festival on January 24, 2016. The film is a documentary that looks at a Brooklyn-based tailoring company that tailors suits for members of the LGBTQ community. It was directed by Jason Benjamin and produced by Konner and Dunham. Suited premiered on HBO in June 2016.

In 2018 Konner began her own production company I Am Jenni Konner Productions. The company has produced the HBO series Camping and Generation.

Lenny Letter 

Konner and Lena Dunham collaborated to create Lenny Letter, a weekly online feminist newsletter. The pair started the project with the intention of giving a platform to young female voices to discuss feminist issues. The newsletter features political essays, personal stories, interviews, artwork and even an advice column from Dunham and Konner themselves called "Letters to Lenny." One notable article was an essay written by actress Jennifer Lawrence about the gender wage gap in Hollywood.

Lenny Letter was supported by Hearst Corporation advertising. In December 2017, it was then supported by Condé Nast.

Konner and Dunham also worked with Random House on a book imprint that will extend the aims of Lenny Letter to book publishing.

In October 2018, it was announced the website would be shutting down, reportedly due to a decline in subscribers and a failure to build momentum on other platforms. Contributors were told a week prior to the shut down, receiving fees for unpublished written works.

Personal life 
Konner lives in Los Angeles, California, with her two children and husband Richard Shepard.

Filmography

References

External links 
 

Sarah Lawrence College alumni
American women screenwriters
American women television writers
Writers from Los Angeles
Living people
Place of birth missing (living people)
Television producers from California
Showrunners
1971 births
People from Brooklyn
American women television producers
American television writers
Jewish American writers
American feminists
Crossroads School alumni
Screenwriters from California
Screenwriters from New York (state)
Television producers from New York City
21st-century American Jews
21st-century American women